Matthew Douglas Salinger (born February 13, 1960) is an American actor. He is known for his appearances in the films Revenge of the Nerds and Captain America.

Early life
Salinger was born February 13, 1960, in Windsor, Vermont, the son of author J. D. Salinger and psychologist Alison Claire Douglas. Salinger's maternal grandfather was British art critic Robert Langton Douglas. He has a sister, Margaret Salinger. His father was of paternal Lithuanian-Jewish descent.

Salinger graduated from Phillips Academy Andover and attended Princeton University before graduating from Columbia University with a degree in art history and drama.

Filmography

Film

Television
{| class="wikitable sortable"
|-
! Year
! Title
! Role
! class="unsortable" | Notes
|-
| 1986
| Blood & Orchids
| Bryce Parker
| (Made for TV) crime-drama film
|-
| 1986
| Manhunt for Claude Dallas
| Claude Dallas Jr.
| (Made for TV)
|-
| 1987
| Deadly Deception
| Jack Shoat
| (Made for TV)
|-
| 1993
| Picket Fences
| Dr. Danny Shreve
| family drama television series
|-
| 1993-1994
| Second Chances
| Mike Chulack
| drama television series
|-
| 2004
| Law & Order: Special Victims Unit
| Seth Webster
| Season 5 / Episode 13 - "Hate"
|-
| 2004-2005
| 24
| Mark Kanar
| Day 3 (Season 3 / 2004): 9:00 a.m.-10:00 a.m.
Day 4 (Season 4 / 2005): 9:00 a.m.-10:00 a.m.
|-
| 2008
| Law & Order: Criminal Intent
| Bill Phillips
| Season 7 / Episode 19 - "Legacy"
|}

Video

Theatre

Career
Salinger made his film debut in 1984's Revenge of the Nerds. He played Captain America in the 1990 film Captain America. 

Salinger subsequently appeared in films including What Dreams May Come and episodes of Law & Order: Special Victims Unit and 24.

Salinger has produced several independent films, including Let the Devil Wear Black and Mojave Moon. 

Salinger made his Broadway debut in 1985, in Bill C. Davis' short-lived Dancing in the End Zone, performing at the Ritz Theater alongside veteran actresses Pat Carroll and Dorothy Lyman. In 2000, he produced the off-Broadway play The Syringa Tree,Gray, Paul (August 6, 2006). "Black, White and Colored". The New York Times. which won a Drama Desk Award, the Drama League Award, the Outer Critic's Circle Award,Jones, Kenneth (August 1, 2001). "Kate Blumberg Branches Out Into Syringa Tree Aug. 1". Playbill. and the Village Voice Obie Award for Best Play of the Year in 2001.

Unpublished works by J. D. Salinger

J. D. Salinger continued to write throughout his life, although he did not publish any works after 1965. His widow, Colleen O'Neill, and Matt Salinger prepared this work for publication after his death, announcing in 2019 that "all of what he wrote will at some point be shared", but that it was a big job and not yet ready.

Personal life

Salinger married jewelry designer Betsy Jane Becker in 1985. They live in Fairfield County, Connecticut, and have sons Gannon and Avery.

In contrast to his sister, Margaret, who wrote a 1999 memoir about her childhood titled Dream Catcher, Salinger is a devoted protector of his father's privacy. A few weeks after Margaret's book was published, Salinger wrote a letter to The New York Observer,'' disparaging his sister's "gothic tales of our supposed childhood."

References

External links
 
 

1960 births
Living people
American male film actors
American male stage actors
American people of German descent
American people of Lithuanian-Jewish descent
American people of Scottish descent
Columbia College (New York) alumni
J. D. Salinger
People from Windsor, Vermont
Phillips Academy alumni
Princeton University alumni
20th-century American writers
Male actors from Vermont
20th-century American male actors
21st-century American male actors